A Decade of Destruction, Volume 2 is the second compilation album by American heavy metal band Five Finger Death Punch. Released on October 9, 2020, the work was published by Better Noise Music.

Track listing

Personnel
Ivan Moody – vocals
Zoltan Bathory – rhythm guitar
Chris Kael – bass, backing vocals (tracks 1–5, 7–11, 14–16), unclean vocals on "Broken World"
Charlie Engen – drums on "Broken World"
Andy James – lead guitar on "Broken World"
Jeremy Spencer – drums (tracks 1–2, 4–17)
Darrell Roberts – guitars on "Never Enough"
Jason Hook – guitars (tracks 1–2, 4–11, 13–17)
Matt Snell – bass (tracks 6, 12, 13, 17)

Charts

References

2020 compilation albums
Five Finger Death Punch albums